Bali Devata Football Club was an Indonesian football club based in Gianyar, Bali. The team played in Liga Primer Indonesia. It then merged with Persires Rengat to form Persires Bali Devata FC.

References

External links

Football clubs in Indonesia
Association football clubs established in 2010
2010 establishments in Indonesia
Association football clubs disestablished in 2011
2011 disestablishments in Indonesia
Defunct football clubs in Indonesia